Tigil is a rural locality (a selo) and the administrative center of Tigilsky District of Koryak Okrug of Kamchatka Krai, Russia. Population:

References

Rural localities in Kamchatka Krai